Gracilipurpura rostrata is a species of sea snail, a marine gastropod mollusk in the family Fasciolariidae, the spindle snails, the tulip snails and their allies.

Description
The length of the shell attains 15.7 mm.

Distribution
This species occurs in the Atlantic Ocean off Morocco.

References

 Salis Marschlins C. U. von (1793). Reisen in verschieden Provinzen den Königreischs Neapel. Zurich and Leipzig, Ziegler Vol. I: pp. 442 + 10 pl.
 del Prete R. (1883). Conchiglie coralligene del mare di Sciacca. Bullettino della Società Malacologica Italiana 9: 254-265
 Coen G. (1918). Di un nuovo Fusus adriatico. Atti della Società Italiana di Scienze Naturali, Pavia 56: 317-319
 Vermeij G.J. & Snyder M.A. (2018). Proposed genus-level classification of large species of Fusininae (Gastropoda, Fasciolariidae). Basteria. 82(4-6): 57-82

External links
 Olivi G. (1792). Zoologia Adriatica, ossia catalogo ragionato degli animali del golfo e della lagune di Venezia. Bassano [G. Remondini e fl.. [ix] + 334 + xxxii pp., 9 pls]
 Lamarck, [J.-B. M. de. (1822). Histoire naturelle des animaux sans vertèbres. Tome septième. Paris: published by the Author, 711 pp]
 Reeve L.A. (1847-1848). Monograph of the genus Fusus. In: Conchologia Iconica, vol. 4, pls 1-21 and unpaginated text. L. Reeve & Co., London
 Monterosato T. A. (di) (1890). Conchiglie della profondità del mare di Palermo. Naturalista Siciliano, Palermo, 9(6): 140-151 [1 marzo; 9(7): 157-166 [1 aprile]; 9(8): 181-191]
 Sturany, R. (1896). Zoologische Ergebnisse VII. Mollusken I (Prosobranchier und Opisthobranchier; Scaphopoden; Lamellibranchier) gesammelt von S.M. Schiff "Pola" 1890-1894. Denkschriften der Kaiserlichen Akademie der Wissenschaften, Mathematische-Naturwissenschaftlischen Classe. 63: 1-36, pl. 1-2.
 Monterosato T. A. (di) (1884). Nomenclatura generica e specifica di alcune conchiglie mediterranee. Palermo, Virzi, 152 pp
 Locard A. (1886). Prodrome de malacologie française. Catalogue général des mollusques vivants de France. Mollusque marins. Lyon, H. Georg & Paris, Baillière : pp. X + 778
 Monterosato T. A. (di) (1890). Conchiglie della profondità del mare di Palermo. Naturalista Siciliano, Palermo, 9(6)
 Locard A. (1891). Les coquilles marines des côtes de France. Annales de la Société Linnéenne de Lyon. 37: 1-385
 Pallary, P. (1900). Coquilles marines du littoral du département d'Oran. Journal de Conchyliologie. 48(3): 211-422
 Pallary, P. (1904-1906). Addition à la faune malacologique du Golfe de Gabès. Journal de Conchyliologie. 52: 212-248, pl. 7 

rostrata
Gastropods described in 1792